Ubaldo Righetti (born 1 March 1963) is an Italian former professional footballer who played as a defender; he was usually deployed as a centre-back.

Club career
Righetti played 10 seasons in the Italian Serie A for A.S. Roma, Udinese, U.S. Lecce, Bari, and Delfino Pescara 1936. He is mostly remembered for his time with Roma under manager Nils Liedholm (1980–1987), the club with which he made his debut, winning the Serie A title during the 1982–83 season, as well as three Coppa Italia titles, in 1981, 1984, and 1986. During his Roma career, he also helped the club to reach the final of the 1983–84 European Cup; he scored in the resulting penalty shootout that Roma eventually lost to Liverpool in the 1984 European Cup Final. Due to his performances in the European Cup with Roma that season, he notably won the Bravo Award in 1984, which is awarded to the best Under-23 played in European Competitions. Despite his talent, Righetti was accused of never fulfilling his potential demonstrated in earlier years, and the later part of his career was much less successful.

In 1987, he transferred to Udinese for a season, and he was subsequently sent to Serie B side Lecce; during his time with the club, he was sent briefly on loan to local side Bari, with which he won the Mitropa Cup in 1990, later moving to Pescara the following season. He ended his career after four seasons with the Serie B club, helping the club to obtain promotion to Serie A during the 1991–92 season, although they would once again be relegated to Serie B the following season. He ended his career with the club in Serie B after the 1993–94 season.

International career
Righetti also made 8 appearances for the Italian national team throughout his career, between 1983–85, under manager Enzo Bearzot.

After retirement
Following his retirement he briefly attempted to pursue a coaching career. He currently works as a commentator for RAI.

Honours

Club
Roma
 Serie A: 1982–83
 Coppa Italia: 1980–81, 1983–84, 1985–86

Bari
 Mitropa Cup: 1990

Individual
 Bravo Award: 1984

References

External links
 
 
 Profile at FIGC.it  

Living people
1963 births
Sportspeople from the Province of Latina
Association football defenders
Italian footballers
Italy international footballers
Italy youth international footballers
Italy under-21 international footballers
Serie A players
Serie B players
A.S. Roma players
Udinese Calcio players
U.S. Lecce players
Delfino Pescara 1936 players
Footballers from Lazio
People from Sermoneta